Paul Poisson (1658 - 28 December 1735) was a French actor.

Life
Born in Paris, he was the son of the actor Belleroche and succeeded his father in the role of 'Crispin' in 1686. He retired for the first time in 1711, returning in 1715 and retiring for good in 1724.

He married the actress Marie Angélique Gassot (1658-1756) - their two sons Philippe and Francois-Arnoul both became actors, whilst their daughter Madeleine-Angélique de Gomez became a writer. He died at the hôtel de Gesvres, 23 rue Neuve-Saint-Augustin, Saint-Germain-en-Laye.

Sources
 Gustave Vapereau, Dictionnaire universel des littératures, Paris: Hachette, 1876, p. 1621

17th-century French male actors
18th-century French male actors
French male stage actors
Male actors from Paris
1658 births
1735 deaths